Edgewood is a neighborhood located on the east side of Atlanta, Georgia, United States, located approximately  east of downtown Atlanta.

History
Edgewood was originally its own town, prior to the city's 1909 annexation across the county line from Fulton into DeKalb. Edgewood was developed during Atlanta’s Reconstruction-era economic boom that lasted from 1870 to 1910. With the extraordinary growth of Atlanta’s population during this time, and the development of an extensive core downtown business district, many forward-looking business and municipal leaders began to see the need for separate areas of recreation and residential development for the ever increasing numbers of those who worked downtown. Unlike other east side neighborhoods, Edgewood was geared primarily towards blue collar workers. As such, the Victorian architecture common in Kirkwood and Candler Park is noticeably absent in Edgewood, the neighborhood's housing stock being composed primarily of craftsman bungalows.

Geography
While the entire Atlanta-in-DeKalb area is sometimes called "east Atlanta," the neighborhood of East Atlanta is to the south-southeast of Edgewood.  Kirkwood is immediately to the east of Edgewood, with Reynoldstown just to the west, and Candler Park to the north.

While Edgewood Avenue was named for Edgewood and stretches from downtown Atlanta in the direction of Edgewood, the avenue does not quite reach the neighborhood.

Commercial district
The Edgewood Retail District is a 44 acre (17.6-hectare) mixed-use village located off Moreland Avenue, on the fringe of Little Five Points. Other tenants include Target, Best Buy, Kroger, Marshalls, Office Depot, Bed Bath & Beyond, Petco, Ross Dress for Less, and Five Guys Burgers and Fries.

See also
Edgewood / Candler Park (MARTA station)

References

External links
Organized Neighbors of Edgewood

Neighborhoods in Atlanta
DeKalb County, Georgia